Mondeville 2 is a shopping centre in Caen, France, and the largest of the Lower Normandy region. It is situated in the suburb of Caen in the town of Mondeville.

The shopping centre was built by the Promodès group for its supermarket brand Continent and opened on 27 June 1995, replacing the older Supermonde (also known as Mondeville 1) which opened in 1970. As well as retail facilities the shopping centre was home to the Promodès headquarters.

Mondeville 2 has a selling area of 60,000 m², of which 12,000 m² are used by Carrefour. It is home to major French supermarket and stores as well as a UGC Ciné Cité cinema.

External links
  Official website

Buildings and structures in Calvados (department)
Shopping centres in France
Tourist attractions in Calvados (department)
Shopping malls established in 1995